Assumption High School is a Catholic all-girls high school located in Louisville, Kentucky, sponsored by the Sisters of Mercy.

History
The history of Assumption High School began in 1951 when the Most Reverend John A. Floersh, Archbishop of Louisville, asked the Sisters of Mercy to establish a new high school at the corner of Bardstown Road and Tyler Lane. The school first opened on September 6, 1955. In that first year, tuition was $100 and the student body consisted of 103 freshmen and 50 sophomores.

The first principal was Sr. Mary Prisca Pfeffer, and the faculty consisted of five Sisters of Mercy. Another sister served as the cook and was the only staff member. For three years, the sisters lived on the third floor of the school until there were finally enough funds to build a separate convent. Their current Principal, Martha Tedesco, graduated from Assumption in 1990. Current enrolment is almost 900 young women, grades 9-12.

Academics
Assumption offers a college preparatory curriculum, with courses at the Academic, Honors, Honors I, Advanced, CP, and AP levels. Advanced Placement (AP) courses are available for freshmen, sophomores, juniors, and seniors. Assumption offers 26 AP classes. Assumption also offers college credit through the ACES Program, which provides dual credit through Bellarmine University, and these courses are commonly referred to as the CP level.

Achievements
Assumption is accredited by the Southern Association of Colleges and Schools and the Kentucky Department of Education. Assumption is one of a dozen schools in the nation to be honored with the National Catholic Education Association's Innovations in Education Award in 2005, as well as one of eight schools to receive the RAMP award for Assumption's model counseling program from the American School Counselor Association.

Assumption was the first school to receive the Beacon of Hope Award, Making a Difference Award from the Learning Disabilities Association of Kentucky. The faculty consists of 79 certified professional teachers, 93% of whom have advanced degrees.

The high school has been named a U.S. Department of Education Blue Ribbon School of Excellence on three separate occasions. Assumption is one of only 41 high schools in the nation and the only all-girls high school in Louisville to receive this award three times.  In 2005, Assumption was one of 30 schools nationwide and the only high school in Kentucky to receive the Blue Ribbon Lighthouse high School Award. In 2021, Assumption was named a Cognia International School of Distinction.

Athletics
Assumption offers 15 sports sanctioned by the Kentucky High School Athletic Association (KHSAA) which include archery, basketball, bowling, cheerleading, cross country, dance, field hockey, golf, lacrosse, soccer, softball, swimming, tennis, track and field, and volleyball.

Assumption has been awarded national titles in dance and volleyball, and has many times taken runner-up in track, volleyball, and field hockey. The dance team has won three national titles: 1999, 2003, and 2005. The volleyball team has won seven national championships, including in 1996, 2000, 2001, and 2005. They have also won 19 state titles in the past 22 years, winning four in a row in 2013, with the most recent in 2015. The volleyball team at Assumption currently ranks #1 in the country according to USA Today. The Field Hockey team has won the KHSAA State Championship 10 times, with the most recent being in 2019.

The cross country team won the state championship in 2007, 2008, and 2010, 2011, 2012, 2013, and 2021. Field hockey won the state championship in 2009 and 2016

Notable alumnae
 Katie George, sports reporter and beauty pageant titleholder
 Maggie Lawson, actress

References

External links
Assumption High School history

Girls' schools in Kentucky
Roman Catholic schools in Louisville, Kentucky
Educational institutions established in 1955
Catholic secondary schools in Kentucky
1955 establishments in Kentucky
Sisters of Mercy schools
High schools in Louisville, Kentucky